Marutharode (also spelled Marutharoad) is a census town, gram panchayat and suburb of Palakkad city in the Palakkad district, state of Kerala, India. It is one of Panchayat which is supposed to be part of proposed Palakkad Municipal Corporation.

Demographics
As of 2011 Census, Marutharode had a population of 24,963 with 12,304 males and 12,659 females. Marutharode had an average literacy of 89.67% higher than the national average of 74.04% and lower than state average of 94.00%; male literacy was 93.72% and female literacy was 85.78%.

References 

 
Suburbs of Palakkad
Cities and towns in Palakkad district
Gram panchayats in Palakkad district